Bodanna is a farmstead in mid Cornwall, England, United Kingdom. It is situated in the civil parish of St Enoder north of the village of Summercourt about four miles (6.5 km) south-west of Newquay.

The nearest settlement is Trewinnion, half-a-mile to the south.

See also

 List of farms in Cornwall

References

Farms in Cornwall